Vestergrenia is a genus of fungi belonging to the family Dothideaceae.   The type species is Vestergrenia nervisequia.

The genus was circumscribed by Heinrich Simon Ludwig Friedrich Felix Rehm in Hedwigia vol.40 on page 100 in 1901.

The genus name of Vestergrenia is in honour of Jacob Tycho Conrad Vestergren (1875–1930), who was a Swedish teacher and botanist (Mycology). He taught chemistry und botany at various schools and university institutions in Stockholm.

Affects
It has been found on the dead stems of Cryptostegia grandiflora in Kannad, India. It causes roundish, dark brown spots about 1mm wide. 
In New Zealand, Vestergrenia leucopogonis  was found on Cyathodes fasciculata and Leucopogon fasciculatus.

Distribution
The genus has almost cosmopolitan distribution, for example species Vestergrenia multipunctata  is found in New Zealand, with Vestergrenia leucopogonis . While specimens of Vestergrenia nervisequia  were found in Rio de Janeiro, Brazil. Vestergrenia pandani  has been recorded in India.

Species
As accepted by Species Fungorum;

Vestergrenia achyranthis 
Vestergrenia atropurpurea 
Vestergrenia bosei 
Vestergrenia cestri 
Vestergrenia chaenostoma 
Vestergrenia clerodendri 
Vestergrenia clusiae 
Vestergrenia daphniphylli 
Vestergrenia dinochloae 
Vestergrenia egenula 
Vestergrenia globosa 
Vestergrenia indica 
Vestergrenia ixorae 
Vestergrenia justiciae 
Vestergrenia kamatii 
Vestergrenia leucopogonis 
Vestergrenia multipunctata 
Vestergrenia neolitseae 
Vestergrenia nervisequia 
Vestergrenia pandani 
Vestergrenia pipericola 
Vestergrenia sarcococcae 
Vestergrenia tetrazygiae 
Vestergrenia venezuelensis 

Former species;
 V. heterostemmatis  = Guignardia heterostemmatis, Phyllostictaceae family
 V. micheliae  = Phyllachorella micheliae, Dothideaceae
 V. umbellata  = Petasodes umbellata, Diaporthaceae family

References

External links
Vestergrenia images and occurrence data from GBIF

Dothideales
Taxa described in 1901
Dothideomycetes genera